Florence is an androgynous French and English given name. It is derived from the French version of (Saint) Florentia, a Roman martyr under Diocletian. The Latin florens, florentius means "blossoming", verb floreo, meaning "I blossom / I flower / I flourish". Florence was in olden times also used as a translation of the Latin version Florentius, and may be used in this context as a male given name.

A notable increase use of the name came in the aftermath of Florence Nightingale, a nurse in British hospitals during the Crimean War and is usually considered the founder of modern nursing. She was given the name because she was born in Florence, Italy. Contrary to popular belief, Nightingale was not the first person to be given this given name in the English speaking world. The wife of Richard de Wylughby, of London, was Florence, in 1349 A later example was Florence Wrey (d.1718), wife of John Cole of the Irish County of Fermanagh (married in 1707), who was herself named after her mother, Florence Rolle, the wife of Sir Bourchier Wrey, 4th Baronet (c. 1653–1696) of Tawstock, Devon, and the daughter of Sir John Rolle (d.1706) of Stevenstone, by his wife and distant cousin Florence Rolle (1630–1705), an even earlier Florence, the daughter and heiress of Denys Rolle (1614–1638), of Stevenstone and Bicton in Devon. This name is also of note because John Cole built a large mansion in Northern Ireland which he named Florence Court after his wife. One of John Cole's descendants, who had become "Lord Enniskillen", planted a peculiarly upright yew tree in the grounds of Florence Court, which was to become the mother tree of all Irish Yews or "Florence Court Yews".

Florencia, a Spanish version, is among the most popular names for baby girls in Argentina and Uruguay. Florence was most popular in the United States between 1900 and 1940, when it was in the top 100 names given to baby girls. The name last ranked in the top 1,000 names given to baby girls in the 1970s. Florence was the fourth most popular name given to baby girls in Quebec, Canada in 2007 and the name has also risen in popularity in England and Wales, where it was the 109th most popular name given to baby girls in 2007.

Name variants
Alternate forms include:
Florance (English) 
Florentine (German)
Fiorentina, Fiorenza (Italian)
Florencia, Florencita, Floriana, Florinia (Spanish)
Flóra (Hungarian)

English nicknames for Florence include Flo, Florrie and Flossie.

Florent and Florenz are masculine equivalents. Florence itself has also been used for boys (Latin Florentius), particularly in Ireland where it was used as an anglicisation of Irish Finnian or Flaithrí.

Notable people
Women
 Florence Auer (1880–1962), American actress
 Florence Austin (1884–1927), American violinist
 Florence Balgarnie (1856–1928), British suffragette, speaker, pacifist, feminist, temperance activist
 Florence Ballard (1943–1976), African-American singer
 Florence Bascom (1862–1945), American geologist
 Florence Beaumont (died 1967), one of eight Americans known to have set themselves on fire in protest of the Vietnam War
 Florence Blatrix-Contat (born 1966), French politician
 Florence Brenzikofer (born 1975), Swiss politician
 Florence V. Brittingham (1856–1891), American poet, short story writer
 Florence Bjelke-Petersen (1920–2017), politician, writer and wife of the longest serving premier Joh Bjelke-Petersen
 Florence Caddy (1837–1923), English writer
 Florence Loiret Caille (born 1975), French actress
 Florence Anderson Clark (1835–1918), American author, newspaper editor, librarian, university dean
 Florence Abigail Cowles (1878-1958), American cookbook author and journalist
 Florence Avalon Daggett (1907–2002), American filmmaker
 Florence Daysh (1908–1979), Barbadian social worker and politician
 Florence Delay (born 1941), French actress
 Florence Eid-Oakden, Lebanese-British economist
 Florence Eiseman (1899–1988), American children's clothing designer
 Florence Eshalomi (born 1980), British politician
 Florence Ezeh (born 1977), French-Togolese hammer thrower
 Florence Faivre (born 1983), Thai actress and model
 Florence Fang (born 1933/1934), American businesswoman, publisher and philanthropist
 Florence Magruder Gilmore (1881-1945), American author
 Florence Hackett (1884–1954), American silent film actress
 Florence Harding (1860–1924), wife of American president Warren G. Harding
 Florence Hay, American baseball player
 Florence Henderson (1934–2016), American actress and singer
 Florence Hoath (born 1984), British actress
 Florence Sally Horner, the child whose kidnapping inspired and is referenced in Vladimir Nabokov's novel Lolita
 Florence Frances Huberwald, American singer, teacher, suffragist, national leader of the women's movement
 Florence Hunt (born 2007), English actress
 Florence Huntley (1861–1912), American journalist, editor, humorist, occult author 
 Florence Carpenter Ives (1854–1900), American journalist 
 Florence Foster Jenkins (1868–1944), American soprano
 Florence Fuller (1867–1946), Australian artist
 Florence Johnston, fictional character on the TV series The Jeffersons and Checking In 
 Florence Griffith Joyner (1959–1998), American athlete in track and field
 Florence Kelley (1859–1932), American social reformist and feminist
 Florence King (1936–2016), Mississippi author
 Florence Knapp (supercentenarian) (1873–1988), American supercentenarian
 Florence E.S. Knapp (1875–1949), American politician
 Florence Knight, British chef and columnist
 Florence E. Kollock (1848-1925), American Universalist minister and lecturer
 Florence LaBadie (1888–1917), Canadian silent movie actress
 Florence Lawrence (1890–1938), inventor and actress, referred to as "The First Movie Star"
 Florence Littauer (1928–2020), American writer and public speaker
 Florence Marly (1919–1978), Czech film and television actress
 Florence Mills (1896–1927), actress in 1920s black theatre and the Harlem Renaissance
 Florence Newton (fl. 1661), Irish alleged witch
 Florence Nightingale (1820–1910), pioneer of modern nursing
 Florence Sillers Ogden (1891–1971), American columnist, segregationist, and white supremacist
 Florence Price (1887–1953), African-American composer and teacher
 Florence Provendier (born 1965), French politician
 Florence Pugh, (born 1996), English actress
 Florence Marjorie Robertson (1904–1986), British actress and singer
 Florence Sabin (1871–1953), anatomist and pathologist, first female professor at Johns Hopkins Medical School
 Florence Senanayake (1903-1988), Sri Lankan Sinhala MP for Kiriella
 Florence Wells Slater (1864–1941), American entomologist and schoolteacher
 Florence Stephens (1881–1979), landholder and the main figure of the Huseby court case
 Florence Sulman (1876–1965), English-Australian author and educationalist
 Florence M. Sullivan (1930–2020), New York politician
 Florence Trail (1854–1944), American educator, writer
 Florence Turner (1885–1946), American actress
 Florence Signaigo Wagner (1919–2019), American botanist who served as president of the American Fern Society
 Florence Warfield Sillers (1869–1958), American historian and socialite
 Florence Welch (born 1986), British singer and frontwoman of indie rock band Florence and the Machine
 Florence Winsome Leighton (born 1948), British television presenter known as Wincey Willis
 Florence Duval West (1840–1881), American poet
 Florence Hull Winterburn (1858–?), American author, editor 
 Florence Wyman-Richardson (1855–1920), American suffragist
Men
 Florence of Worcester (died 1118), medieval chronicler
 Florance Broadhurst (1861–1909), West Australian businessman
 Florence Hensey, Irish-born French spy
 Florence Wilson (1504-1546/7), Scottish humanist

See also
 Florence (disambiguation)
 Florine
 Fiorenza (disambiguation)

References

English feminine given names
Given names derived from plants or flowers